Numedia may refer to:

Media
New Media
"numedia" demogroup of Moppi Productions
NuMedia, New York music producers, Life on a String (album)
NUMedia, student media society, University of Northampton

Music
Numedia (Naio Ssaion album), Slovenian-language album 2004

See also
Kingdom of Numidia